is an autobahn in Germany.

The first section of the highway was built in 1973, along with the construction of the A 46 through the area. The freeway ran between the A 46 and B 7, a distance of 2 km; it was signed upon completion as the B 224n. Until the tunnel Großer Busch was completed in 1990, this was the shortest stretch of autobahn-standard freeway in Germany. The tunnel connected the short stretch of freeway to a longer one (current A 535 junctions 1 to 4). The freeway was not officially signed as an autobahn, however, until 1 September 2007.

A planned extension of the A 535 across the Ruhr towards Essen and the A 52 was classified as "urgent" in the latest Bundesverkehrswegeplan (Federal Transport Infrastructure Plan). The project was completed on 1 January 2010. However, the new stretch of autobahn was instead designated as part of the A 44.

Exit list

|}

External links
 Autobahn Atlas: A535


535